Wendingen (Dutch: Inversion or Upheaval, literally turns) was an architecture and art magazine that appeared from 1918 to 1932. It was a monthly publication aimed at architects and interior designers. The booklet was published by Amsterdam publisher Hooge Brug (1918–1923) and by the Santpoort publisher C.A. Mees (1924–1931). It was a mouthpiece for the architect association Architectura et Amicitia. (Architecture and Friendship). The chief editor was the architect Hendricus Theodorus Wijdeveld. Wendingen initially was an important platform for Dutch expressionism, also known as the Amsterdam School, and later endorsed the New Objectivity.

In spite of the link of Wendingen with an architect's association, the contents of the booklet were not limited to architecture but attention was also given to art and design. The magazine gained recognition not only through its content but also by its remarkable square format and the striking typography of architect Hendrik Wijdeveld, El Lissitzky, Vilmos Huszar and others.

In Modern architecture of the 1920s are three notable movements: Cubist, Expressionist and Constructivist architecture. The magazine Wendingen (first issue January 1918) was influential on international Expressionist architecture. The other Dutch magazine De Stijl (first issue October 1917) was influential on the International Style.

Book cover illustrations 1918–1931

Bibliography
M.F. Le Coultre, Wendingen 1918-1932 - Architectuur en vormgeving, Blaricum 2001. Dutch edition, 272 pages with articles and all 116 covers.

External links

 Wendingen, Digital Magazines IADDB. See also Periodicals: Wendingen Dutch, English, French, German. (Publication date, not date in magazine).
 Wendingen, Dutch digital platform Amsterdam School
 Het maandblad Wendingen (Website ZuidelijkeWandelweg.nl)

1918 establishments in the Netherlands
1932 disestablishments in the Netherlands
Architecture magazines
Defunct magazines published in the Netherlands
Monthly magazines published in the Netherlands
Dutch-language magazines
Magazines established in 1918
Magazines disestablished in 1932
Magazines published in Amsterdam
Design magazines